The 1974–75 Buffalo Sabres season was the Sabres' fifth season in the National Hockey League (NHL). The Sabres finished in a tie for the best record in the NHL in the 1974–75 regular season after a disappointing 1974 that saw the 1973–74 team fail to return to the NHL playoffs as they had the year before. Buffalo advanced to the Stanley Cup finals for the first time in team history to play against the rough Philadelphia Flyers (who had been recently nicknamed the "Broad Street Bullies"), a series which included the legendary Fog Game (game three of the series).  The Sabres lost the series 4–2.

The season marked the Sabres' second NHL playoffs appearance.  The season was the first under the tenure of Floyd Smith and the team's first in the newly created Adams Division in the NHL's Prince of Wales Conference.

Sabres players earned numerous accolades.  Don Luce won the Bill Masterton Memorial Trophy. Rick Martin, Rene Robert, Jerry Korab and Luce were all selected to the 1975 NHL All-Star Game.  Martin was a first team NHL All-Star team selection at left wing, while Robert was a second team selection at right wing. The French Connection (Martin, Robert and Gilbert Perreault) were all among the league leaders in important scoring statistics.

Transactions
Goaltender Dave Dryden was lost to the World Hockey Association following the 1973–74 season.  During the 25-round May 1974 NHL amateur draft that was held by conference call, the team participated in the first twelve rounds of the draft.  Although several of their selections eventually played in the NHL, the Sabres only drafted three players that played for the team that year.  The Sabres acquired defenseman Lee Fogolin (1st round, 11th overall), right winger Danny Gare (2nd round, 29th overall) and defenseman Paul McIntosh (4th round, 65th overall) in the 1974 NHL amateur draft.  They had acquired left winger Morris Titanic in the 1973 NHL Amateur Draft (1st round, 12th overall) and he was called up from the team's American Hockey League minor league affiliate, the Hershey Bears during the season.  In addition, the Sabres drafted Taro Tsujimoto with the 183rd overall pick.

Prior to the season, the team had lost right winger Ron Busniuk to the Detroit Red Wings in the June 10, 1974 NHL Intra-League Draft.  Buffalo lost right winger Steve Atkinson and center Randy Wyrozub to the Washington Capitals in the June 12, 1974 NHL Expansion Draft.  The team also lost defenseman Paul Terbenche to the Kansas City Scouts in the same draft.

On October 14, 1974, The Sabres acquired 1974 All-Star defenseman Jocelyn Guevremont and forward Bryan McSheffrey from the Vancouver Canucks in exchange for left winger Gerry Meehan and defenseman Mike Robitaille. On January 27, 1975 Buffalo acquired left winger Fred Stanfield from the Minnesota North Stars for right winger Norm Gratton and Buffalo's 3rd round choice in 1976 NHL Amateur Draft.  The veteran Stanfield had finished in the top ten in the league four times in assists before being acquired by the Sabres. The Sabres acquired the NHL rights to goaltender Gerry Desjardins from the New York Islanders for defenseman Garry Lariviere on February 19, 1975.

In May, after the season ended, left winger Rick Dudley, who later coached the Sabres for three seasons, signed to play in the WHA. After 11 seasons in the NHL, 1974–75 was the final one for right winger Larry Mickey before his retirement.

Regular season

October–December
The Sabres returned after a season of injury and tragedy in which their captain Tim Horton died in an automobile accident.  The team also seemed to have mended an apparent preseason feud between Perreault and Martin.  On October 10, 1974, in the season-opening game, Danny Gare set the tone for the new season by scoring a goal 18 seconds into the first game of his career. Perreault added a hat trick and two assists in the 9–5 victory over the Boston Bruins.  After starting the season 3–3–1, the Sabres had an 18–1–3 hot streak between October 26 and December 8, 1974, to move to a 21–4–4 record.  By the time they reached 7–3–1 following a November 3 victory over the New York Rangers, they had taken over the Adams Division lead. The streak included two unbeaten stretches of at least 10 games.  They went 9–0–1 on a streak that extended until November 14 with a win against the Minnesota North Stars.  The penultimate win of the streak was the Sabres' first ever win at the Montreal Forum on November 13.

After a November 16, loss to the Bruins, they started a 9–0–2 streak on November 17 against the Atlanta Flames.  In the third game of this streak, which was also against the Flames, they made a comeback from two separate three-goal deficits to tie the game.  The other tie during the streak was also a comeback.  By the end of the two unbeaten streaks and before the 30-game mark, the Sabres had the best record in the NHL, the league's leading scorer in Perreault, three 20-goal scorers among the French Connection and the leading rookie scorer in the league in Gare.  Martin had the second four-goal game of his career in a December 3 5–3 victory against the Washington Capitals on the road.  Perreault had three goals and an assist in the December 5 9–2 victory against the Washington Capitals at home. Then, Martin was lost with a recurring thumb injury. Following Martin's injury, the Sabres eleven-game unbeaten streak came to an end, and the team had two different three-game stretches without a win that started in December.

January–February
The team posted a season high six-game win streak between January 12, 1975 – January 25, 1975. The streak culminated in a second win against the Montreal Canadiens on the road. After a February 1 loss to the Philadelphia Flyers, the Sabres went undefeated for the rest of the month. The team had a season-high 12-game unbeaten streak between February 2, 1975 – February 27, 1975.  During that streak, the team went 7–0–5. The 4–4 February 16 tie with the St. Louis Blues clinched a playoff spot for the Sabres. The February 18 3–2 victory over the New York Islanders at the Nassau Coliseum was only the second loss of the season for the Islanders at home.  The February 20 6–6 tie against the Flyers, in which the Sabres lost several leads, extended the Flyers unbeaten streak against the Sabres to nine.  The final game of the streak was a 5–0 shutout victory over the Los Angeles Kings, who had handed the Sabres three of their eleven defeats prior to that point in the season.

March–April
At the beginning of March, Desjardins quit the Baltimore Blades of the World Hockey Association to join the Sabres.  Desjardins was frustrated at not getting paid when attendance was sparse. On March 16 against the Toronto Maple Leafs, Martin dislocated his thumb during a fight. This necessitated that he wear a cast. Desjardins made his first appearance in a March 20 6–3 victory over the New York Rangers. In their last win of the month, the Sabres clinched the division title on March 23 with a 9–4 victory over the California Golden Seals.  Rookie defenseman Hajt was injured with a broken bone in his foot during a 5–1 loss to the Chicago Blackhawks on March 26.  The Sabres would lose the next two games for the season's only three-game losing streak.  The Sabres ended the season by winning all three regular season games in April.  The Sabres did not clinch the Prince of Wales Conference until winning the final game of the season against the Maple Leafs.

The season was the first of three full seasons coached by Floyd Smith, who had coached one game during the 1971–72 season. Smith had played for the Sabres during their first two seasons.  The team played its home games at Buffalo Memorial Auditorium.  Two members of the team later coached the Sabres: Dudley and Jim Schoenfeld.

Season standings

Results
The following is a Sabres game log.

Player statistics
The French Connection members led the Sabres in scoring by finishing 1–2–3 in both goals and points, although none of them played as many as 75 of the team's 80 games.  Perreault's eight game-winning goals was fifth highest in the NHL for the season, although he only played 68 games, he finished ninth in the league in scoring with 96 points (39 goals and 57 assists).  Martin also only played 68 games and finished third in goals (52) and tenth in points (95). Martin's 21 power play goals was second in the league. Robert was seventh in points (100), tenth in goals (40) and tenth in assists (60) in 74 games. Luce's 8 shorthanded goals was second and Craig Ramsay had 7, which was third. Other statistical leaders included Luce who had a 61 plus/minus, which ranked fourth and Peter McNab who led the league in shooting percentage.

Over the course of the season, the team scored a total of 354 goals, which ranked second in the 18 team league and its 49–16–15 record ranked it first in the league.  The team used several goaltenders. Although Gary Bromley led the team with 26 wins in the regular season, and Roger Crozier was second with 17 wins, the team was led in the post season by Desjardins who recorded 7 of the team's 10 post season victories.

The following are the season statistics for the Sabres.

Key

Skaters 

Note 1: A bench minor is when the team is penalized for a minor infraction that is not attributed to any individual player.

Goaltenders

Regular season

Playoffs

Playoffs

Schedule and results
The following was the team playoff schedule.

Quarter-finals
The Sabres had a bye in the first round of the playoffs and then met the first round victor Chicago Black Hawks in the quarter-finals. In the first game of the series, the Sabres were the beneficiaries of an 18–2 penalty minutes differential and won 4–1.  Although the Black Hawks scored in the first minute of game two, the Dudley scored a pair of goals on the way to a 3–1 Sabres victory. In game three, the Black Hawks took a one-goal lead four times and the Sabres tied the score each time, which led to sudden death overtime in which Chicago came out on top.  The Sabres scored five times in the third period to post a 6–2 victory in game 4.  The Sabres won the series 4–1, with Robert scoring the series clinching goal after getting into fisticuffs with Pit Martin and third man Phil Russell (who got ejected) earlier in the clinching game.

Semi-finals
The Sabres won the first game with an overtime goal by Gare.  In game two, Robert was sidelined with the flu and Dudley was inactive due to a sprained knee, but the checking line of Luce, Ramsay and Gare each scored a goal as the Sabres took a 2–0 lead with a 4–2 victory. In the game, Henri Richard surpassed his brother Maurice Richard with his 127th Stanley Cup playoff point.  Following their strong 7–0 game three performance, the Canadiens handily won game four at home by an 8–2 margin.  The game was marked by a bench clearing incident when Doug Risebrough and Gare squared off.  Bill Hajt got ejected as third man in and Larry Robinson who took on Hajt was also ejected.  The Sabres surrendered an early 3–1 lead, but won in overtime of game five on Robert goal. The Sabres scored three goals in the first period of game six on their way to a series-clinching 4–3 victory.  They led 3–1 after one period and added one in the second before withstanding a third period two-goal rally by Montreal.

Stanley Cup finals

The Flyers came into the series with their own good luck pre- game singer in the form of Kate Smith who sang "God Bless America" before home games at The Spectrum.  The Flyers had a 43–3–1 record following her pregame performances in lieu of the traditional "Star Spangled Banner".  In addition, the Sabres had never won a game against the Flyers in Philadelphia in their short five-year franchise history, had never beaten Flyer starting goalie Bernie Parent, and entered the series on a 13-game streak against the Flyers without a win.

Although the Sabres held the Flyers to two shots in the first period of game one, eight in the second, and were the beneficiaries of a 1:04 two-man advantage at one point, the game remained scoreless until the third period when the Flyers connected four times in a 4–1 victory. In game two, the Sabres were held to 19 shots on goal with none coming after Bobby Clarke scored at the 6:43 mark of the third period.

Due to unusual heat in Buffalo in May 1975, portions of game three, which is known as "The Fog Game", were played in heavy fog.  The game was stopped 12 times due to the conditions.  Buffalo goalie Desjardins gave up three first period goals, and Crozier started the second period.  After having surrendered goals on his first two shots faced and three of his first six, Desjardins removed himself from the game. The Sabres recovered from the three-goal deficit on two goals 17 seconds apart by Gare and Martin.  After a goal by Luce netted the score, Reggie Leach gave the Flyers the lead again.  Bill Hajt scored his first career playoff goal to tie the score.  Robert scored the game winner in overtime with a goal that Flyer goalie Bernie Parent did not see until it was too late.  The game was the longest NHL overtime game in over four years. Players, officials, and the puck were invisible to many spectators. During a face-off and through the fog, Sabres center Jim Lorentz spotted a bat flying across the rink, raised his stick, and killed it. Many superstitious Buffalo fans considered this to be an "Evil Omen," pertaining to the result of the series. It was the only time that any player killed an animal during an NHL game. This was one of three playoff appearances for Crozier.  Desjardins surrendered a goal on the third Flyer shot in game four, but he stayed in the game for a 4–2 victory.  In game four, the unseasonable temperature only caused the play to be stopped twice (with 8:08 and 4:44 remaining) as five pairs of arena employees skated around the ice with bed sheets to clear the haze.

By game five of the finals Dave Schultz had claimed both the single-season regular season penalty minutes record and the post-season record. However, he contributed his first two goals of the playoffs in a 5–2 win to help the Flyers take a 3–2 lead in the series.  It was Schultz' first two-goal performance of the season and his first goal since March 9. 
In the sixth game Conn Smythe Trophy MVP Bernie Parent shut out the Sabres 2–0 to clinch the series four games to two. Crozier held the Flyers scoreless for the first two periods of the final game.

Awards and records
 Prince of Wales Trophy
 Bill Masterton Memorial Trophy: Don Luce
 Rick Martin, 1975 NHL All-Star Game, NHL All-Star team, Left Wing (1st team)
 Rene Robert, 1975 NHL All-Star Game, NHL All-Star team, Right Wing (2nd team)
 Don Luce 1975 NHL All-Star Game
 Jerry Korab 1975 NHL All-Star Game
 Peter McNab NHL shooting percentage leader (24.4%)
 Club Record, Most Goals For, (354)

Notes

External links
 1974–75 Sabres at Hockeydb.com
 1974–75 Sabres at Hockey-reference.com

Buffalo Sabres seasons
Buffalo
Buffalo
Adams Division champion seasons
Eastern Conference (NHL) championship seasons
Buffalo
Buffalo